National Night Out is a community-police awareness-raising event in the United States, held the first Tuesday of August (Texas celebrates on the first Tuesday in October).

History
The event has been held annually since 1984, and is sponsored by the National Association of Town Watch in the United States. National Night Out began simply with neighbors turning on their porch lights and sitting in front of their homes. The first National Night Out involved 2.5 million residents across 400 communities in 23 states; National Night Out 2016 involved 38 million residents in 16,000 communities across the United States.

Activities 
The event is meant to increase awareness about police programs in communities, such as drug prevention, town watch, neighborhood watch, and other anti-crime efforts.

The events are typically organized by block watches, nonprofit organizations, companies, and police departments. These events can be as simple as backyard cookouts or as complex as full-blown festivals like the one on the west side of Columbus, Ohio. The South Central Hilltop Block Watch in Columbus organizes one of the largest, which includes live music, food, and entertainment.

In Oxnard, California, neighborhoods such as Sycamore Senior Village have cookouts, live music, dancing, and visits by police officers, fire fighters, and paramedics with safety demonstrations, exhibits, and projects for all residents.

References

External links 
 , main web site

August observances
Civil awareness days
Civil crime prevention
Holidays and observances by scheduling (nth weekday of the month)
Law enforcement in the United States
Law enforcement in Canada
October observances
Recurring events established in 1984
Tuesday observances